The Apostle Church is a church building of the Church of Denmark in the Vesterbro district of Copenhagen. It was built in 1901 by architect Valdemar Koch.

References

Sources
http://www.nordenskirker.dk/Tidligere/Apostel_kirke/Apostel_kirke.htm 
http://www.korttilkirken.dk/kirkerA/apostel.htm

Churches in Vesterbro/Kongens Enghave
Lutheran churches in Copenhagen
Churches in the Diocese of Copenhagen